Raul Silva may refer to:

 Raúl Silva Henríquez (1907-1999), Chilean prelate
 Raul Silva (footballer) (born 1989), Brazilian footballer

See also 
Raoul Silva